The Los Cardones National Park is a national park of Argentina, located in the center-west of the province of Salta, within the San Carlos and Cachi Departments, in the Argentine Northwest.

Location

The park protects an area of the High Monte ecoregion.
The park has an area of 650 square kilometres, with hills and ravines at the height levels between 2,700 m and 5,000 m. It gets its name from the prevalence of bush formations of cardon grande cactus. It features fossil remains of extinct animals, as well as dinosaur tracks.

The protected area was created in 1996, when the National Parks Administration acquired the land from private owners.

Climate
Most of the park has an arid climate that is characterized by a large thermal amplitude (large difference between day and night temperatures). Snowfall is extremely rare in low-lying areas.

Gallery

References

Administración de Parques Nacionales - National Parks Administration of Argentina (in Spanish and English)

National parks of Argentina
Protected areas of Salta Province
Protected areas established in 1996
High Monte